North York City Centre is an office tower complex in Toronto, Ontario, Canada. Completed in 1989, it is home to the North York Central Library, secondary offices of the City of Toronto government, and other corporate headquarters.

The 18-storey, glass-clad structure overlooks Mel Lastman Square and North York City Hall. It is across the street from Empress Walk. On the north side is the Novotel (North York) hotel. It is located in the North York City Centre district at 5160 Yonge Street.

External links
North York City Centre

Buildings and structures in Toronto
North York
Office buildings completed in 1989